Evolution is the seventh studio album by American heavy metal band Disturbed. It was released on October 19, 2018, by Reprise Records. The album's first single, "Are You Ready", was released before the album in August 2018, while the second single, "A Reason to Fight", was released a month later. The third single, "No More", was released on June 2, 2019.

The album debuted at number four on the Billboard 200, making it Disturbed's sixth straight top 5 album. It is the band's first album since The Sickness not to reach number one, thus ending the band's streak of number one albums at five.

Background and recording
The band announced in January 2018 that they had begun recording their seventh studio album. Recording finished in June with just mixing and mastering needing to be done. It was the band's first album in over three years and the band's first album in over eight years to involve bass guitarist John Moyer. Frontman David Draiman stated that the writing and recording of the album was influenced by classic rock that members have listened to in their youth. Guitarist Dan Donegan stated that the album's title was representative of their goal on the album, to challenge themselves to evolve their sound. He also revealed that there would be no new cover songs from this album's cycle. Draiman stated that Evolution is the band's "Black Album". He also said that the album covers topics in today's society such as government, death, war, addiction, and technology.

The album is a tribute to deceased heavy metal musicians such as Chester Bennington of Linkin Park and Vinnie Paul of Pantera, with whom Disturbed were friends and toured with over the years.

Promotion and release
On August 16, 2018, the album's name was revealed as Evolution, and the first single, "Are You Ready", was released. On the same day, the album's track listing, artwork and release date were also revealed. A second song, "A Reason to Fight", was released on September 21, 2018. A third song, "No More", was released on June 2, 2019. All three songs were released as singles and topped the Billboard Mainstream Rock Songs chart, making them the fifth, sixth, and seventh singles in a row by the band to top the chart, the longest streak of consecutive number-ones by any band as of September 2021. A fourth single, "Hold On to Memories", was released in late 2019 and peaked at #3 in early 2020, ending their streak of consecutive number-ones.

The band held a worldwide tour, with Three Days Grace on North American stops, from January to May 2019 to promote the album.

Reception

Evolution has received mixed reviews from music critics. Consequence of Sound writer Spencer Kaufman stated that "The heavy songs on Evolution should please longtime fans, with a couple harkening back to the dynamism of Disturbed's first couple of albums, but the glut of softer tracks may have been served better on a separate acoustic EP." AllMusic gave the album 3 out of 5 stars, the same as Immortalized, and said "While it's hard to argue that Evolution lives up to its moniker, the familiarity of the architecture is lent considerable gravitas by the overall execution, which as per usual, leaves nothing but perspiration in its wake." On review aggregation website Metacritic, the album has a score of 58/100 
based on 7 reviews, indicating "mixed or average reviews".

Prior to the release of the album, the band had their prior five albums in a row debut at number one on the Billboard 200. Evolution debuted at number four, breaking the streak, which would have made them the only band other than Dave Matthews Band and Metallica to have done so.

Track listing
All music composed by Disturbed and Kevin Churko, except as indicated.

Personnel
Credits adapted from album's liner notes.

Disturbed
David Draiman – lead and background vocals
Dan Donegan – guitars, bass, piano, electronics, background vocals
Mike Wengren – drums, percussion, background vocals
John Moyer – bass, background vocals

Additional musicians
Kevin Churko – additional keyboards and programming

Production
Kevin Churko – producer, engineer, mixing
Kane Churko – additional engineering
Tristan Hardin – additional engineering
Khloe Churko – general assistance and studio manager
Ted Jensen – mastering

Deluxe edition
Myles Kennedy – guest vocals 
Jeremy Jayson – additional live guitar 
Disturbed – producer 
Ashton Parsons – engineer, mixing 
Brent Carpenter – engineer 
Sam de Jong – producer, engineer, mixing, and programming 
Kevin Churko – engineer and additional production 
Ted Jensen – mastering 
David Foster – producer and keyboards 
Warren Huart – engineer 
Matthew Knobel – assistant engineer 
Jochem van der Saag – mixing and programming 
Sean Hurley – bass

Charts

Weekly charts

Year-end charts

References

2018 albums
Disturbed (band) albums
Reprise Records albums